This is a list of earthquakes in 1938. Only magnitude 6.0 or greater earthquakes appear on the list. Lower magnitude events are included if they have caused death, injury or damage. Events which occurred in remote areas will be excluded from the list as they wouldn't have generated significant media interest. All dates are listed according to UTC time. This was once again a very busy year with 22 events reaching 7.0+. Topping the list was a huge quake which struck the Banda Sea, Dutch East Indies in February. At a magnitude of 8.5 this was one of the largest earthquakes of all time. Despite the large size no deaths were reported. Despite the array of large events, the death toll for the year was only 296. Turkey saw the majority of the deaths due to a 6.6 magnitude event in April. November saw a series of large quakes strike off the east coast of Honshu, Japan. Also in November was a magnitude 8.3 which struck Alaska. Generally Dutch East Indies and Japan saw most of the large 7.0+ events.

Overall

By death toll 

 Note: At least 10 casualties

By magnitude 

 Note: At least 7.0 magnitude

Notable events

January

February

March

April

May

June

July

August

September

October

November

December

References

1938
 
1938